Méréaucourt is a commune in the Somme department in Hauts-de-France in northern France.

Geography
This village is one of the least populous communes in the Hauts-de-France region (8 people in 2018).

History
A priory was built here in the 12th century, belonging to the abbey of Saint-Valery-sur-Somme. It comprised a church, cemetery and farm.

Population

See also
Communes of the Somme department

References

Communes of Somme (department)